At the Edge of Waking is a collection of fantasy short stories by Holly Phillips. It was first published as an ebook by Prime Books in April 2012, with a trade paperback edition following in September of the same year.

The book collects eleven novellas, novelettes and short stories by the author, together with an introduction by Peter S. Beagle and story notes by the author.

Contents
"Introduction" (Peter S. Beagle)
"Three Days of Rain"
"Cold Water Survival"
"Brother of the Moon"
"The Rescue"
"Country Mothers' Sons"
"Proving the Rule"
"Virgin of the Sands"
"Gin"
"Queen of the Butterfly Kingdom"
"The Long, Cold Goodbye"
"Castle Rock"
"Story Notes"

Notes

2012 short story collections
Fantasy short story collections
Prime Books books